AutoCAD Architecture (abbreviated as ACA) is a version of Autodesk's flagship product, AutoCAD, with tools and functions specially suited to architectural work.

Architectural objects have a relationship to one another and interact with each other intelligently. For example, a window has a relationship to the wall that contains it. If you move or delete the wall, the window reacts accordingly. Objects can be represented in both 2D and 3D.

In addition, intelligent architectural objects maintain dynamic links with construction documents and specifications, resulting in more accurate project deliverables. When someone deletes or modifies a door, for example, the door schedule can be automatically updated. Spaces and areas update automatically when certain elements are changed, calculations such as square footage are always up to date.

AutoCAD Architecture uses the DWG file format but an object enabler is needed to access, display, and manipulate object data in applications different from AutoCAD Architecture.

AutoCAD Architecture was formerly known as AutoCAD Architectural Desktop (often abbreviated ADT) but Autodesk changed its name for the 2008 edition. The change was made to better match the names of Autodesk's other discipline-specific packages, such as AutoCAD Electrical and AutoCAD Mechanical.

As of AutoCAD 2019 all discipline-specific packages are included as Industry-Specific Toolsets with AutoCAD subscription but still as individual installers.

Version history

See also 
 Autodesk
 AutoCAD
 DWF
 DWG
 Comparison of CAD editors for architecture, engineering and construction (AEC)

References

External links 
 Autodesk AutoCAD Architecture
 Autodesk User Group International (AUGI)
Uses of AutoCAD Architecture

Architecture
Autodesk products
Windows-only software
Computer-aided design software
Building information modeling